Lys Gomis (born 6 October 1989) is a Senegalese retired footballer who played as a goalkeeper. Born in Italy, he represented the Senegal national team internationally.

Club career

Torino and loans
Gomis began his playing career at Torino, where after a series of loans, he made his debut in Serie B against Albinoleffe. On 28 November 2012 he made his debut in the Coppa Italia against Siena, ending 2–0 in favour of the Tuscans.

On 31 January 2013, he was loaned to Ascoli for 6 months. On 6 March 2013, he made his debut with the bianconeri, during a match against Cesena, won 2–1 by Ascoli. At the end of season collected 6 appearances, conceding 9 goals.

Gomis returned to Torino in 2013–14. On 30 November 2013, he debuted in Serie A, substituting Daniele Padelli in the 52nd minute, against Genoa (1–1). It would remain his only appearance of the season.

On 4 July 2014, he was officially transferred on loan to Trapani in Serie B. On 4 October 2014, he made his official debut against Latina, won 1–0 by Trapani. In all he played 29 games and finished 5th in the Top 15 of the goalkeepers in Serie B according to a list compiled by the Lega Serie B.

Lecce
On 9 July 2016, he moved outright to Lega Pro side Lecce, with whom he signed a one-year contract. He played 11 games for the giallorossi side and then moved to Paganese on 31 January 2017.

Later years and retirement
In 2021, after almost two years of inactivity following an injury while at Teramo, he confirmed his retirement from active football, while introducing also a new goalkeeping coaching school founded by him.

International career
Gomis was called up by Senegal for a friendly match against Mali on 5 March 2014, ending 1–1.

Personal life
Gomis is son of Senegalese immigrants in Italy residing in Cuneo and formally obtained Italian citizenship on 11 July 2012. He is of Bissau-Guinean descent through his maternal family.

He has two younger brothers that are also goalkeepers: Alfred and Maurice, both of whom developed with Torino.

References

External links

 

1989 births
Living people
Senegalese footballers
Association football goalkeepers
ACS Poli Timișoara players
Liga I players
Senegal international footballers
2015 Africa Cup of Nations players
Senegalese expatriate footballers
Senegalese expatriate sportspeople in Romania
Expatriate footballers in Romania
Senegalese people of Bissau-Guinean descent
People from Cuneo
Footballers from Piedmont
Italian footballers
Torino F.C. players
Casale F.B.C. players
Ascoli Calcio 1898 F.C. players
Trapani Calcio players
Frosinone Calcio players
U.S. Lecce players
Paganese Calcio 1926 players
S.S. Teramo Calcio players
Serie A players
Serie B players
Serie C players
Italian people of Senegalese descent
Italian people of Bissau-Guinean descent
Italian sportspeople of African descent
Italian expatriate footballers
Italian expatriate sportspeople in Romania
Sportspeople from the Province of Cuneo